Frederick Squire Sings Shenandoah and Other Popular Hits is the second solo album by Canadian singer-songwriter Frederick Squire, released May 24, 2011 on Blue Fog Recordings.

Although the album's title implies that it is a covers album, only the album's lead track, "Shenandoah", is in fact a cover.

Critic John Terauds of the Toronto Star rated the album 3-1/2 out of 4 stars, while Brad Wheeler of The Globe and Mail gave it 3 stars out of 4. The Coast's critic listed it as one of the best albums of 2011.

Track listing
 "Shenandoah"
 "Peaceful Valley"
 "The Human Race Can Be a Very Nasty Animal"
 "Every Dollar Bill Could Kill Me"
 "All Things Past Serve to Guide You on Your Way"
 "There's a Place That I Can Go"
 "Lucky Number Seven"
 "We Live Beyond"
 "Theme from a Small Towne Movie"

References

2011 albums
Frederick Squire albums